The Furnace Hill Brook Historic and Archeological District in a historic district in Cranston, Rhode Island.

The site features archaeological industrial remains dating from the early 19th century, as well as a series of prehistoric Native American settlements, dating from the Late Archaic to the Early Woodland periods.  One major locus of the Native settlements, a knoll at the confluence of Furnace Hill Brook, Church Brook, and Meshanticut Brook, was destroyed in 1967 by the construction of a highway cloverleaf (the interchange between I-295 and Rhode Island Route 37), although salvage archaeology was successful in obtaining some artifacts.  Further up Furnace Hill Brook are the remains of an iron foundry established in 1812.

The site was added to the National Register of Historic Places on August 6, 1980.

See also

National Register of Historic Places listings in Providence County, Rhode Island

References

Historic districts in Providence County, Rhode Island
Cranston, Rhode Island
Historic districts on the National Register of Historic Places in Rhode Island
National Register of Historic Places in Providence County, Rhode Island